The New Preston Hill Historic District encompasses a small rural 19th-century village center in the New Preston area of the town of Washington, in Litchfield County, Connecticut.  Settled in the late 18th century, it is distinctive for its examples of stone architecture, include a rare Federal period stone church.  The district, located at the junction of New Preston Road with Gunn Hill and Findlay Roads, was listed on the National Register of Historic Places in 1985.

Description and history
The New Preston area was first settled in the 1750s, and the New Preston Hill junction was where its first meeting house was built in 1754.  The area was by then of recognized significance for the crossroads, with New Preston Road serving as a stage route between Hartford, Connecticut and the Hudson River.  The village supported the surrounding agricultural community, but declined in importance in the mid-19th century, when the village New Preston became more important for the water power the drove its industries.

The historic district encompasses about  around the junction of New Preston Road with Gunn Hill Road and Findlay Road.  The main focus of the district is a triangular green, with the 1824  Old Stone Church as its main focus.  This church has no heat or electricity and is used during the summer and for weddings.  The church has another building, the "Village Church" that is used for the rest of the year, outside this district.  The district includes other nine other mainly residential properties surrounding the green, and extending westward along New Preston Road.

There are 12 contributing buildings:
Hill Congregational Church, which "dominates" the district; it has been documented in drawings by the Historic American Buildings Survey
a district school
a parsonage
Rev. Samuel Whittlesey House, from 1808
John Ferris House, from 1800
Newton's Tavern, c. 1900, a Federal/Greek Revival building with 12 over 12 windows (meaning 12 panes in upper and lower sashes)
a tollhouse from the 18th century, which has lost exterior appearance as such
house on Parcel 25, Federal/Greek Revival, with fluted pilasters, above the road behind a stone wall. Property also has a barn 
house on Parcel 26
house on Parcel 33
house on Parcel 35
horse barn on Parcel 35
sheep barn on Parcel 35

See also
National Register of Historic Places listings in Litchfield County, Connecticut

References

External links
Historic American Buildings Survey set of drawings for the Congregational church
 Report of the Historic District Study Commission, Town of Washington, Connecticut. 1975.

Federal architecture in Connecticut
Italianate architecture in Connecticut
Historic districts in Litchfield County, Connecticut
National Register of Historic Places in Litchfield County, Connecticut
Historic districts on the National Register of Historic Places in Connecticut
Washington, Connecticut